Liptena turbata is a butterfly in the family Lycaenidae. It is found in Cameroon, the Republic of the Congo, Gabon and the southern part of the Democratic Republic of the Congo.

References

Butterflies described in 1890
Liptena
Butterflies of Africa